Megachile texana, the Texas leafcutter bee, is a species of bee in the family Megachilidae. It was first described by the American entomologist Ezra Townsend Cresson in 1878. It is native to the United States and southern Canada.

Description
The head and thorax are clad in short, dense whitish hair. The wings are semi-transparent with black veins. The abdomen is barred in black and yellowish-white.

Biology
The nests of Megachile texana often occur in pasture, with the entrance being under a rock, under a clod of earth or in one case, on a small hillock. Sometimes a pre-existing cavity is used, but females have been observed excavating their own nests. A single cell or several cells may be constructed, each lined with cut portions of leaf in a similar way to the nests of Megachile rubi. Each cell is half-filled with a mixture of pollen and nectar and an egg laid on the food mass. The larva consumes its food supply and when sufficiently developed becomes an inactive prepupa enclosed in a cocoon which fills the cell. The outer surface of the cocoon is wound round with brownish threads.

References

Texana
Hymenoptera of North America
Insects of Canada
Insects of the United States
Insects described in 1878